Events from the year 1793 in Scotland.

Incumbents

Law officers 
 Lord Advocate – Robert Dundas of Arniston
 Solicitor General for Scotland – Robert Blair

Judiciary 
 Lord President of the Court of Session – Lord Succoth
 Lord Justice General – The Viscount Stormont
 Lord Justice Clerk – Lord Braxfield

Events 
 2 January – Radical Thomas Muir of Huntershill arrested on a charge of sedition but released on bail.
 20 July – Stornoway-born explorer Alexander Mackenzie's 1792–1793 Peace River expedition to the Pacific Ocean reaches its goal at Bella Coola, British Columbia, making him the first known person to complete a transcontinental crossing of northern North America.
 17 August – 79th Regiment of Foot (Cameronian Volunteers) raised at Fort William from members of Clan Cameron by Alan Cameron of Erracht.
 24 August – Thomas Muir arrested at Portpatrick on his return from France.
 31 August – Thomas Muir sentenced to penal transportation for 14 years.
 Little Cumbrae Lighthouse built.
 Piershill Barracks in Edinburgh and Queen's Barracks in Perth completed, originally for cavalry regiments.

Births 
 6 March – William Dick, founder of Edinburgh Veterinary College (died 1866)
 3 April – Alexander Nicoll, Orientalist (died 1828 in Oxford)
 1 June – Henry Francis Lyte, Anglican divine and hymn-writer (died 1847 in Nice)
 James Browne, man of letters (died 1841)

Deaths 
 5 January – John Howie, biographer (born 1735)
 2 February – William Aiton, botanist (born 1731)
 20 March – William Murray, 1st Earl of Mansfield, judge and politician (born 1705)
 2 April or May – Colin Macfarquhar, bookseller and printer, co-founder of Encyclopædia Britannica (born 1744 or 1745?)
 11 June – William Robertson, historian and Principal of the University of Edinburgh (born 1721)
 16 October – John Hunter, surgeon (born 1728)
 James Small, inventor (born 1740)

The arts
 27 July – Robert Burns sets out on his first Galloway tour.
 August – Burns writes "Scots Wha Hae".

References 

 
Scotland
1790s in Scotland